The Saint Louis Billikens women's basketball team is a college basketball program representing Saint Louis University. They compete in the Atlantic 10 Conference.

History
As of the end of the 2021–22 season, the Bilikens have an all-time record of 552–734. They have made appearances in the WNIT in 2016, 2017, 2018, and 2021.

Notable players
 Denisha Womack, Plays for the St. Louis Surge in the Women's Blue Chip Basketball League.

References

External links